eaglet may refer to:

 An eaglet, the immature young of an eagle, which in turn encompasses several species of bird of prey
 HMS Eaglet (shore establishment), home of Royal Naval Reserve Merseyside, Royal Marines Reserve Merseyside and Liverpool URNU since 1995
 USS Eaglet (SP-909), later YP-909, a United States Navy patrol boat in commission from 1917 to 1921
 P92 Eaglet, a high-winged, light aircraft built by the Tecnam aircraft company
 The Eaglet, nickname for Napoleon II
 Eaglet (Alice's Adventures in Wonderland), a character from Alice's Adventures in Wonderland by Lewis Carroll
 Isis Eaglet, also known as Isis Egret, a character in Magical Chronicle Lyrical Nanoha Force
 Orlyonok (Russian: Орлёнок, Orlyonok), the Russian Children's Center, literally eaglet
 The Eaglet (1931 film), a French historical drama film
 The Eaglet (1913 film), a French silent historical film
 Eaglet (HBC vessel), 1668, see Hudson's Bay Company vessels
 Eaglets, a 1944 Swedish drama film

See also 
 Aiglon (disambiguation)
 Eagle (disambiguation)